The 1864 United States presidential election in Kentucky took place on November 8, 1864, as part of the 1864 United States presidential election. Kentucky voters chose 11 representatives, or electors, to the Electoral College, who voted for president and vice president.

Kentucky was won by the 4th Commanding General of the United States Army George B. McClellan, running with Representative George H. Pendleton, with 69.83% of the popular vote against the incumbent President Abraham Lincoln, running with former Senator and Military Governor of Tennessee Andrew Johnson, with 30.17% of the popular vote.

Despite having been born and raised for the first five years of his life in Kentucky, Lincoln came in a distant second, losing to McClellan by 39%. In addition, it was the only state that McClellan won by more than 6%. As of the 2020 presidential election, this is the last occasion when Butler County and Monroe County voted for a Democratic presidential candidate.

Results

See also
 United States presidential elections in Kentucky

References

Kentucky
1864
1864 Kentucky elections